Bernadette Renaud (born April 18, 1945) is a Canadian writer living in the Montérégie region of Quebec.

Biography
Bernadette Renaud was born in Ascot Corner, April 18, 1945. She worked in a school library and then taught primary school before becoming a writer full-time. Her 1986 book Bach et bottine was made into a film of the same name; the English version was Bach and Broccoli. The film won eighteen international awards and was awarded a UNESCO Special Award for the International Year of the Family. Renaud wrote the words for a record album Bach et Bottine which received an award for Best Children's LP from ADISQ. She has received the  several times. Some of her work has been translated into English and into Braille.

Renaud wrote scripts for television, including several episodes for the series , Michou et Piloo and Watatatow. She also wrote the script for a National Film Board short Quand l'accent devient grave and a children's play Une boîte magique très embêtante.

Selected works 
 Le Chat de l'oratoire, youth literature (1978)
 La Maison tête de pioche, youth literature (1979)
 Un Homme comme tant d'autres, trilogy - adult fiction (1992-1994), received the 
 La Quête de Kurweena, philosophical tale (1997)
 Les Chemins d'Ève, adult fiction - four volumes (2002-2006)
 Les gros bisous, youth literature (2004)
  Perdu dans la brume, novel (2009)

References

External links 
 

1945 births
Living people
Canadian women screenwriters
Canadian novelists in French
Canadian children's writers in French
Writers from Quebec
Canadian women children's writers